Vitaly Bigdash (Russian: Виталий Бигдаш; born July 25, 1984) is Russian mixed martial artist who competes in the Middleweight division of ONE Championship. He was a former ONE Middleweight World Champion, having won the title after defeating Igor Svirid of Kazakhstan at ONE Championship: Tigers of Asia on October 9, 2015.

As of September 4, 2022, Bigdash is ranked the #67 Light Heavyweight in the world by Tapology.com, a prominent and credible MMA Site.

Mixed martial arts career

ONE Championship

ONE Middleweight Champion
Bigdash made his promotional debut challenging Igor Svirid for the ONE Middleweight World Championship at ONE Championship: Tigers of Asia on October 9, 2015. After weathering an early storm in the first round, Bigdash came back to knock out Svirid in the second round to become the new ONE Middleweight World Champion.    

Bigdash was originally scheduled to defend his title against Marcin Prachnio at ONE Championship: Quest for Power on January 14, 2017. However, Prachnio was forced to withdraw due to injury and was replaced by Aung La Nsang. Bigdash retained the title by unanimous decision. 

He rematched with Aung La Nsang at ONE Championship: Light of a Nation on June 30, 2017. Bigdash lost the title by unanimous decision.

Post-title reign
Bigdash was scheduled to face Leandro Ataides at ONE Championship: Grit and Glory on May 12, 2018. He lost by technical knockout in the third round.

Bigdash was scheduled to face Yuki Niimura at ONE Championship: Destiny of Champions on December 7, 2018. He won via first-round submission.

Bigdash was originally set to challenge Aung La Nsang for the ONE Light Heavyweight World Championship at ONE on TNT 4 on April 28, 2021. However, he was forced to withdraw after testing positive for COVID-19 and was replaced by Reinier de Ridder.

After a three-year absence, Bigdash returned to face Fan Rong at ONE Championship: Winter Warriors 2 on December 17, 2021. He by third-round submission via guillotine choke.

Bigdash was scheduled to challenge Reinier de Ridder for the ONE Middleweight World Championship at ONE 159 on July 22, 2022. He lost by first-round technical submission via inverted triangle choke.

Championships and accomplishments
ONE Championship
ONE Middleweight World Championship (One time, former)
One successful defense

Mixed martial arts record

|-
| Loss
| align=center| 12–3
| Reinier de Ridder
| Technical Submission (inverted triangle choke)
| ONE 159 
| 
| align=center| 1
| align=center| 3:29
| Kallang, Singapore
| 
|-
| Win
| align=center| 12–2
| Aung La Nsang
| Decision (unanimous)
| ONE: Full Circle
| 
| align=center| 3
| align=center| 5:00
| Kallang, Singapore
| 
|-
| Win
| align=center| 11–2
| Fan Rong
| Submission (guillotine choke)
| ONE: Winter Warriors II 
| 
| align=center| 3
| align=center| 0:41
| Kallang, Singapore 
| 
|-
| Win
| align=center| 10–2
| Yuki Niimura
| Submission (reverse triangle armbar)
| ONE 84: Destiny of Champions
| 
| align=center| 1
| align=center| 4:24
| Kuala Lumpur, Malaysia
|
|-
| Loss
| align=center| 9–2
| Leandro Ataides
| TKO (punches)
| ONE 70: Grit and Glory 
| 
| align=center| 3
| align=center| 2:37
| Jakarta, Indonesia 
| 
|-
| Loss
| align=center| 9–1
| Aung La Nsang
| Decision (unanimous)
| ONE 55: Light of a Nation 
| 
| align=center| 5
| align=center| 5:00
| Yangon, Myanmar 
| 
|-
| Win
| align=center| 9–0
| Aung La Nsang
| Decision (unanimous)
| ONE 50: Quest for Power 
| 
| align=center| 5
| align=center| 5:00
| Jakarta, Indonesia
| 
|-
| Win
| align=center| 8–0
| Igor Svirid 
| TKO (knee and punches)
| ONE 31: Tigers of Asia
| 
| align=center| 2
| align=center| 0:36
| Kuala Lumpur, Malaysia 
| 
|-
| Win
| align=center| 7–0
| Magomed Magomedkerimov
| Submission (rear-naked choke)
| ProFC 57: New Era
| 
| align=center| 3
| align=center| 4:20
| Rostov-on-Don, Russia
|
|-
| Win
| align=center| 6–0
| Charles Andrade
| Submission (triangle choke)
| ProFC 54: Challenge of Champions
| 
| align=center| 3
| align=center| 2:39
| Rostov-on-Don, Russia
|
|-
| Win
| align=center| 5–0
| Pavel Pokatilov
| TKO (elbows and knees)
| ProFC 53: Khachatryan vs. Egorov 
| 
| align=center| 3
| align=center| 0:48
| Rostov-on-Don, Russia
| 
|-
| Win
| align=center| 4–0
| Dmitriy Emets
| KO (kick)
| Oplot Challenge 87
| 
| align=center| 1
| align=center| 0:53
| Kharkov, Ukraine
| 
|-
| Win
| align=center| 3–0
| Ertan Balaban
| Submission (heel hook)
| Glory 6: Istanbul 
| 
| align=center| 1
| align=center| 3:36
| Istanbul, Turkey 
| 
|-
| Win
| align=center| 2–0
| Yuriy Shtembulyak
| TKO (punches)
| ProFC 45: Thunder In Grozny
| 
| align=center| 2
| align=center| 1:39
| Grozny, Russia
|
|-
| Win
| align=center| 1–0
| Davrbek Isakov
| Submission (armbar)
| ProFC 41: Octagon 
| 
| align=center| 1
| align=center| 1:41
| Rostov-on-Don, Russia
| 
|-

See also 
 List of current ONE fighters
 List of male mixed martial artists

References

 1984 births
Sportspeople from Rostov-on-Don
Russian male mixed martial artists
Mixed martial artists utilizing Muay Thai
Mixed martial artists utilizing Kyokushin kaikan
Mixed martial artists utilizing wrestling
Russian Muay Thai practitioners
Russian male karateka
Living people
ONE Championship champions